Jennifer Szalai is the nonfiction critic at The New York Times. Szalai was born in Canada and attended the University of Toronto, studying political science and peace and conflict. She also holds a master's degree in international relations from the London School of Economics.

During the 2000s, she was a senior editor for reviews at Harper's Magazine. Her reviews have also appeared in the London Review of Books, The New Yorker, and many more publications.

She started working as the nonfiction critic for the Times in January 2018, after having worked for four years as an editor for The New York Times Book Review. Szalai is one of the three professional critics who write for The New York Times, together with Dwight Garner and Parul Sehgal. Her reviews appear on Wednesdays. She is also a frequent contributor to The Book Review Podcast. 

Frank Rich referred to Szalai's review of Woodward's book Rage as a "Didion-worthy dissection". In February 2023, she wrote a similar review of a book by DeSantis.

References 

Living people
Year of birth missing (living people)
The New York Times people
University of Toronto alumni
Alumni of the London School of Economics